Basit is a metre used in classical Arabic poetry.

Basit may also refer to:

Places
 Basit, Ardabil, a village in Ardabil Province, Iran
 Basit, Hashtrud, a village in East Azerbaijan Province, Iran
 Basit, Meyaneh, a village in East Azerbaijan Province, Iran

People with given name Basit
 Basit Ali, Pakistani cricketer
 Basit Ashfaq, Pakistani squash player

People with surname Basit
Malik Basit or Malik B. (1972–2020), American rapper

Names of God in Islam